Lampe may refer to any of the following:

People

Carlos Lampe, Bolivian football goalkeeper
Charles John Frederick Lampe, English composer and organist
Derek Lampe, English footballer
Elmer A. Lampe, American coach of American football and basketball
Geoffrey Hugo Lampe,  British theologian
Isabella Lampe,  English operatic soprano
J. Bodewalt Lampe, Danish-American composer and arranger
John Frederick Lampe (1703–1751), Anglo-German composer
John R. Lampe, U.S. historian
Jutta Lampe (1937–2020), German actress
Maciej Lampe (born 1985), Polish basketball player
Oliver Lampe (born 1974), German butterfly and freestyle swimmer
Sara Lampe, member of the Missouri House of Representatives

Places
Lampe (Crete), a town of ancient Crete, Greece
Lampe, Missouri, United States